Balete Drive is an undivided two-lane street and main thoroughfare of New Manila, Quezon City, Philippines. The road is a major route of jeepneys and cabs, serving the New Manila area, connecting Eulogio Rodriguez Sr. Avenue and Nicanor Domingo Street in Quezon City.

The road is noted for a number of balete trees that previously lined it, and urban legends of a white lady ghost.

Route description

Balete Drive connects the long span between Eulogio Rodriguez Sr. Avenue and Nicanor Domingo Street in New Manila, Quezon City. The Balete Drive corner at E. Rodriguez is a bustling business area mushroomed with fast foods and other establishments.

One of its major intersection is with the Aurora Boulevard, a major road which leads to Cubao, a major commercial district in Quezon City.

The avenue is classified as a national tertiary road of the DPWH's Philippine highway network.

History
Balete Drive was named after a gargantuan balete tree that used to stand in the middle of the road. The road, although the exact construction date is unknown, had been cemented and asphalted and became a main thoroughfare during the regime of President Ferdinand Marcos in the early 1970s. There are several Spanish houses in the area, including the famous 200-year-old "Centennial House", which supports the claim that Balete Drive has been in use since the late Spanish era towards the end of the 19th century.

Urban legend
In the past, the street was lined with large balete trees that darkened the area considerably and made it appear "frightening" to some Manila residents. In Pinoy folklore, balete trees are believed to be a "home for spirits and mysterious creatures". Various legends and folklore have circulated since the 1950s that the street was haunted.

Most of the legends describe a kaperosa (white lady) ghost, a popular character in the Philippine folklore, who is supposedly haunting taxi drivers "for eternity". According to legend, the ghost is a teenage girl who was run over and killed by a taxi driver at night, then buried around a Balete tree in Balete Drive. One variation of the legend claims a student at the University of the Philippines was sexually assaulted and killed by a taxi driver, and her spirit roams the street looking for her murderer. Another version of the story claims that a female resident of one of the ancestral mansions lining Balete Drive was abused and killed by her own family, and her spirit haunts the road, seeking help from passing drivers. According to local rumor, the legend of Balete Drive was "fabricated by a reporter in  1953 in order to come up with an interesting story".

In 2005, a Quezon City barangay official proposed that the city could use the legends to boost tourism by declaring the street "haunted" and making it available for Halloween parties.

Zoning laws
The segment of Balete Drive from Aurora Boulevard to Eulogio Rodriguez Sr. Avenue has been zoned by the Bureau of Internal Revenue (BIR) for regular residential and commercial purposes.

In popular culture 
The street is featured in the 1988 horror film Hiwaga sa Balete Drive, where it retells the supposed paranormal activities experienced by people who live, or have traveled, along the street.

The Netflix-exclusive anime-influenced series Trese features Balete Drive as the location of a crime scene. The exact intersection and its street where it occurs however is fictional, as 13th Street in New Manila does not actually intersect Balete Drive.

See also
Major roads in Metro Manila
Aurora Boulevard
Haunted highway
List of reportedly haunted locations in the Philippines

References

External links

1970s architecture
1970s establishments in the Philippines
Streets in Quezon City
Reportedly haunted locations in the Philippines